Tatsuhiko Toshino (born January 18, 1988) is a Japanese professional basketball player who plays for the Ehime Orange Vikings of the B.League in Japan.　He played college basketball for Osaka University of Commerce. He was selected by the Gunma Crane Thunders with the 11th overall pick in the 2012 bj League draft. He is a new captain of the Happinets in 2018. He torn his right knee ACL on February 23, 2019.

Career statistics

Regular season 

|-
| align="left" | 2012-13
| align="left" | Gunma
| 49||8 || 13.1|| .290|| .207|| .655|| 2.3|| 0.9|| 0.6|| 0.0||  4.2
|-
| align="left" | 2013-14
| align="left" | Gunma
| 31||6 || 7.2|| .286|| .235|| .731|| 0.9|| 0.4|| 0.4|| 0.0||  2.4
|-
| align="left" | 2014-15
| align="left" | Shinshu
| 50||10 || 11.5|| .389|| .224|| .481|| 2.4|| 0.9|| 0.6|| 0.1||  3.1
|-
| align="left" | 2015-16
| align="left" | Oita Ehime
| 50|| 50||33.1 ||.362 ||.308 ||.698 ||3.0 ||4.4 ||1.7 ||0.2 ||14.5
|-
| align="left" | 2016-17
| align="left" | Ehime
| 52||52 ||32.5 ||.374 ||.280 ||.775 ||3.6 ||3.5 ||1.6 ||0.3 || 13.5
|-
| align="left" | 2017-18
| align="left" | Ehime
| 53||53 ||bgcolor="CFECEC"|33.1* ||.441 ||.350 ||.718 ||3.8 ||5.2 ||1.1 ||0.2 ||12.4
|-
| align="left" | 2018-19
| align="left" | Akita
|10 || 1||9.6 ||.220 ||.100 ||.000 ||0.6 || 1.1||0.2 ||0.0 ||1.3
|-
| align="left" | 2018-19
| align="left" | Sendai
|15 || 5||15.3 ||.321 ||.130 ||.600 ||1.7 || 1.8||0.4 ||0.2 ||4.6
|-
| align="left" | 2019-20
| align="left" | Ehime
|45 || 45||27.3 ||.369 ||.272 ||.723 ||2.4 || 3.2||1.2 ||0.1 ||8.9
|-
|}

Early cup games 

|-
|style="text-align:left;"|2018
|style="text-align:left;"|Akita
|2 || 2 || 20:58 || .250 || .000 || .600 || 2.5 || 3.0 || 2.0 || 0 || 5.5
|-
|style="text-align:left;"|2019
|style="text-align:left;"|Ehime
|2 || 2 || 26:27 || .158 || .083 || .000 || 4.5 || 1.5 || 0.5|| 0 || 3.5
|-

Preseason games

|-
| align="left" |2018
| align="left" | Akita
| 2 || 0 || 16.6 || .286 ||.000  || .000||1.0 || 3.0|| 1.0 || 0.0 ||  2.0
|-

Source: Changwon1Changwon2

Personal
He is a son of Masahiko Toshino.
His brother, Yoshihiko, plays for the Kumamoto Volters of the B.League.

References

1988 births
Living people
Akita Northern Happinets players
Ehime Orange Vikings players
Gunma Crane Thunders players
Japanese men's basketball players
Sendai 89ers players
Shinshu Brave Warriors players
Sportspeople from Ehime Prefecture
Shooting guards